"Big Sam" is a nickname for:

 Big Sam (musician), New Orleans trombone player of "Big Sam's Funky Nation"
 Sam Allardyce (born 1954), English football player and manager
 Big Sam (American football), college football player
 Sam Thompson (1860–1922), baseball player
 Sam McDonald (1762–1802), an unusually tall Scottish soldier
 Sam Houston High School (Arlington, Texas), United States

Lists of people by nickname